HJS may refer to:

 Croatian Sailing Federation
 Henry Jackson Society, a British think tank
 Hindu Janajagruti Samiti, an Indian civil rights organisation
 Paarl Boys' High School, in Western Cape Province, South Africa
 Sikorsky HJS, an American helicopter
 Hic jacet sepultus (Latin; "here lies buried"); see List of Latin phrases (H)